Alameda station is a RTD light rail station in Denver, Colorado, United States. Operating as part of the D, E and H Lines, the station was opened on October 8, 1994, and is operated by the Regional Transportation District.

References 

RTD light rail stations in Denver
Railway stations in the United States opened in 1994